This gene encodes a member of the G protein-coupled receptor kinase subfamily of the Ser/Thr protein kinase family, and is most highly similar to GRK4 and GRK5. The protein phosphorylates the activated forms of G protein-coupled receptors to regulate their signaling.

Function 

G protein-coupled receptor kinases phosphorylate activated G protein-coupled receptors, which promotes the binding of an arrestin protein to the receptor. Arrestin binding to phosphorylated, active receptor prevents receptor stimulation of heterotrimeric G protein transducer proteins, blocking their cellular signaling and resulting in receptor desensitization. Arrestin binding also directs receptors to specific cellular internalization pathways, removing the receptors from the cell surface and also preventing additional activation. Arrestin binding to phosphorylated, active receptor also enables receptor signaling through arrestin partner proteins. Thus the GRK/arrestin system serves as a complex signaling switch for G protein-coupled receptors.

GRK6 and the closely related GRK5 phosphorylate receptors at sites that encourage arrestin-mediated signaling rather than arrestin-mediated receptor desensitization, internalization and trafficking (in contrast to GRK2 and GRK3, which have the opposite effect). This difference is one basis for pharmacological biased agonism (also called functional selectivity), where a drug binding to a receptor may bias that receptor’s signaling toward a particular subset of the actions stimulated by that receptor.

GRK6 is widely and relatively evenly expressed throughout the body, but with particularly high expression in immune cells. GRK6 exists in three splice variants that differ in the carboxyl terminal region that regulates membrane association: one form is palmitoylated, another contains a lipid-binding polybasic domain, and the third is truncated and has neither. In the mouse, GRK6 regulates the D2 dopamine receptor in the striatum region of the brain, and loss of GRK6 leads to increased sensitivity to psychostimulant drugs that act through dopamine. Overexpression of GRK6 in the striatum in a rat model of Parkinson’s disease improves drug-induced movement disorder (tardive dyskinesia) symptoms arising from L-DOPA therapy. In mouse immune cells, GRK6 is important for chemotaxis of B-lymphocytes and T-lymphocytes in response to the chemoattractant CXCL12, and of neutrophils to sites of injury in response to leukotriene B4.

References

Further reading

EC 2.7.11